Lotus aduncus species of Lotus that is native in Europe.  This species grows leaves that has fur-like trichomes, the buds may look identical to the leaves but are concaved and pink-tipped. The flowers are pink that look much like orchids.

References

aduncus
Plants described in 1855
Flora of Greece